Maniwak is a village in Wasior district, Teluk Wondama Regency in West Papua province, Indonesia. Its population in 2010 was 2174.

Climate
Maniwak has a cool tropical rainforest climate (Af) due to altitude with heavy rainfall year-round.

References

Populated places in West Papua